Aliceton is an unincorporated community in Boyle County, Kentucky, in the United States.

History
Aliceton was a station on the railroad. A post office was established at Aliceton in 1866, and remained in operation until it was discontinued in 1941.

References

Unincorporated communities in Boyle County, Kentucky
Unincorporated communities in Kentucky